Nina Brohus Agdal (born 26 March 1992) is a Danish model known for her appearances in the Sports Illustrated Swimsuit Issue and, alongside Chrissy Teigen and Lily Aldridge, appeared on the 50th anniversary cover in 2014.

Early life
Agdal was born 26 March 1992 in Denmark, where she grew up in the town of Hillerød.

Career 
Agdal was discovered while on a street in her home town. Having no modeling experience, she entered the Elite Model Look competition. She did not win, but did then sign with Elite Models Copenhagen and continued school until she was 18. After graduation, she moved to the United States, after which her modeling career blossomed. She has modeled for Billabong, Victoria's Secret, Adore Me, Bebe Stores and Calzedonia. She has also been in fashion editorials for Vogue Mexico, Elle, Cosmopolitan and CR fashion book by Carine Roitfeld. In 2012, she made her first appearance in the Sports Illustrated Swimsuit Issue and was subsequently named the issue's "Rookie of the Year". She also appeared on the cover of Maxim magazine for its March issue in 2017. In 2014, she appeared on the 50th anniversary cover of the Sports Illustrated Swimsuit Issue with Chrissy Teigen and Lily Aldridge, which she regards as the "highlight" of her modeling career.

Agdal appeared in a 2013 Super Bowl television commercial for Carl's Jr./Hardee's. In August 2016 she signed with IMG Models.

Personal life 
Agdal briefly dated Adam Levine, front man of Maroon 5, in 2013. Later that year, she dated Max George, member of boy band The Wanted. The couple broke up in 2014.

Agdal dated actor Leonardo DiCaprio for about a year; they broke up in 2017. She then dated British actor Jack Brinkley-Cook for four years. Their relationship ended in 2021. 

As of 2022, she is dating YouTube star Logan Paul.

Filmography 
Don Jon (2013) as Supermodel in commercial (cameo)
Entourage (2015) as Bridgite (cameo)

References

External links 

 
 
 
 Nina Agdal gallery at Sports Illustrated Swimsuit
 Nina Agdal profile at Models.com

1992 births
Danish female models
Living people
Danish expatriates in the United States
People from Hillerød Municipality